Paranyctimene  is a genus of bats in the family Pteropodidae. They are distributed in  Indonesia

Taxonomy 
The genus was proposed by George Henry Hamilton Tate in American Museum Novitates (1942), describing specimens obtained on the Archbold 1936-37 expedition to New Guinea.
Resembling the genus Nyctimene, the tube-nosed bats, the taxon was reduced to a subgenus of that group in 2001. However, the Mammal Species of the World demurred from this arrangement, pending analysis of the phylogeny of both groups, instead recognising the following taxa,

Paranyctimene
 Paranyctimene raptor (Lesser tube-nosed fruit bat), the type, first proposed in 1942.
 Paranyctimene tenax Bergmans, 2001 (Steadfast tube-nosed fruit bat)
 Paranyctimene tenax tenax 
 Paranyctimene tenax marculus Bergmans, 2001

References

 
Bat genera
Taxa named by George Henry Hamilton Tate